Astenus is a genus of rove beetles.

Species 
Over 480 species are accepted within Astenus, arranged within several subgenera. Additionally, some species have subspecies.

Astenus (Astenopleuritus) 

 Astenus (Astenopleuritus) caspiracus Coiffait, 1982
 Astenus (Astenopleuritus) emodensis Coiffait, 1982
 Astenus (Astenopleuritus) flavescens Scheerpeltz, 1933
 Astenus (Astenopleuritus) gratellus  (Fauvel, 1879)
 Astenus (Astenopleuritus) leptocerus  (Eppelsheim, 1895)
 Astenus (Astenopleuritus) marginalis Cameron, 1931
 Astenus (Astenopleuritus) melanurus  (Küster, 1853)
 Astenus (Astenopleuritus) pulchripennis Cameron, 1931
 Astenus (Astenopleuritus) semibrunneus Cameron, 1931
 Astenus (Astenopleuritus) simlaensis Cameron, 1931
 Astenus (Astenopleuritus) suturalis Cameron, 1931

Astenus (Astenus) 

 Astenus (Astenus) adonis Coiffait, 1960
 Astenus (Astenus) aegyptiacus Coiffait, 1971
 Astenus (Astenus) aequivocus (Wollaston, 1860)
 Astenus (Astenus) algarvensis Coiffait, 1969
 Astenus (Astenus) anguinus (Baudi di Selve, 1848)
 Astenus (Astenus) anguinus anguinus (Baudi di Selve, 1848)
 Astenus (Astenus) anguinus oblongicollis C.Koch, 1940
 Astenus (Astenus) angulatus (Sharp, 1874)
 Astenus (Astenus) asper (Aubé, 1850)
 Astenus (Astenus) assingi Bordoni, 1994
 Astenus (Astenus) baali Coiffait, 1960
 Astenus (Astenus) berberus Coiffait, 1960
 Astenus (Astenus) bhotius Coiffait, 1978
 Astenus (Astenus) bimaculatus (Erichson, 1840)
 Astenus (Astenus) bimaculatus auliensis Coiffait, 1984
 Astenus (Astenus) bimaculatus bimaculatus (Erichson, 1840)
 Astenus (Astenus) bimaculatus cinguliventris C.Koch, 1936
 Astenus (Astenus) blinsteini Coiffait, 1969
 Astenus (Astenus) bucharensis Bernhauer, 1902
 Astenus (Astenus) bulgaricus Coiffait, 1971
 Astenus (Astenus) cachemiricus Coiffait, 1982
 Astenus (Astenus) calpensis Coiffait, 1971
 Astenus (Astenus) carteyus Coiffait, 1960
 Astenus (Astenus) catalanus Coiffait, 1980
 Astenus (Astenus) circumflexus Jarrige, 1952
 Astenus (Astenus) cribrellus (Baudi di Selve, 1870)
 Astenus (Astenus) dakini Coiffait, 1978
 Astenus (Astenus) dimidiatus (Wollaston, 1864)
 Astenus (Astenus) dogueti Coiffait, 1980
 Astenus (Astenus) estrelensis Coiffait, 1969
 Astenus (Astenus) fageli Coiffait, 1960
 Astenus (Astenus) fageli fageli Coiffait, 1960
 Astenus (Astenus) fageli luteomarginatus Coiffait, 1969
 Astenus (Astenus) fallax (Saulcy, 1865)
 Astenus (Astenus) fauveli (Eppelsheim, 1888)
 Astenus (Astenus) filum (Aubé, 1850)
 Astenus (Astenus) flavus (Kraatz, 1859)
 Astenus (Astenus) gaditanus Bordoni, 1983
 Astenus (Astenus) gattoi Cameron, 1910
 Astenus (Astenus) gracilicornis (Luze, 1904)
 Astenus (Astenus) gracilis (Paykull, 1789)
 Astenus (Astenus) gracilitarsis Coiffait, 1973
 Astenus (Astenus) hastatus Coiffait, 1971
 Astenus (Astenus) hervei Coiffait, 1960
 Astenus (Astenus) immaculatus Stephens, 1833
 Astenus (Astenus) indicus (Kraatz, 1859)
 Astenus (Astenus) indicus conradsi Bernhauer, 1937
 Astenus (Astenus) indicus indicus (Kraatz, 1859)
 Astenus (Astenus) italicus Coiffait, 1960
 Astenus (Astenus) jarrigei Coiffait, 1980
 Astenus (Astenus) jordanicus Coiffait, 1981
 Astenus (Astenus) klapperichi Coiffait, 1980
 Astenus (Astenus) ladakhensis Coiffait, 1982
 Astenus (Astenus) laticeps (Merkl, 1991)
 Astenus (Astenus) lepidulus Normand, 1936
 Astenus (Astenus) leucadiae Bordoni & F.E.Bordoni, 1989
 Astenus (Astenus) libanicus Coiffait, 1971
 Astenus (Astenus) lithocharoides (Solsky, 1874)
 Astenus (Astenus) lucidus Jarrige, 1952
 Astenus (Astenus) lyonessius (Joy, 1908)
 Astenus (Astenus) macrocephalus Coiffait, 1960
 Astenus (Astenus) maculatus Cameron, 1920
 Astenus (Astenus) maculipennis (Kraatz, 1859)
 Astenus (Astenus) maculipennis maculipennis (Kraatz, 1859)
 Astenus (Astenus) maculipennis mauritiensis Lecoq, 2002
 Astenus (Astenus) marocanus Coiffait, 1971
 Astenus (Astenus) megacephalus (Wollaston, 1864)
 Astenus (Astenus) megacephalus coiffaiti Israelson, 1971
 Astenus (Astenus) megacephalus gomerensis (Wollaston, 1865)
 Astenus (Astenus) megacephalus megacephalus (Wollaston, 1864)
 Astenus (Astenus) melanopygus (Eppelsheim, 1886)
 Astenus (Astenus) menozzii C.Koch, 1937
 Astenus (Astenus) misellus (Mulsant & Rey, 1880)
 Astenus (Astenus) morvani Jarrige, 1971
 Astenus (Astenus) nepalensis Coiffait, 1975
 Astenus (Astenus) nepalicus Herman, 2003
 Astenus (Astenus) nigromaculatus (Motschulsky, 1858)
 Astenus (Astenus) obliquus Jarrige, 1952
 Astenus (Astenus) pakistanus Coiffait, 1982
 Astenus (Astenus) pallidulus (Wollaston, 1864)
 Astenus (Astenus) phenicius Coiffait, 1960
 Astenus (Astenus) pictipennis Fauvel, 1900
 Astenus (Astenus) pictiventris Normand, 1938
 Astenus (Astenus) porosus (Sharp, 1889)
 Astenus (Astenus) pourtoyi Coiffait, 1960
 Astenus (Astenus) procerus (Gravenhorst, 1806)
 Astenus (Astenus) pseudomegacephalus Israelson, 1971
 Astenus (Astenus) puglianus Coiffait, 1960
 Astenus (Astenus) pulchellus (Heer, 1839)
 Astenus (Astenus) romanus Coiffait, 1960
 Astenus (Astenus) rufopacus Reitter, 1909
 Astenus (Astenus) serpentinus (Motschulsky, 1858)
 Astenus (Astenus) suffusus (Sharp, 1874)
 Astenus (Astenus) temperei Coiffait, 1971
 Astenus (Astenus) thaboris (Saulcy, 1865)
 Astenus (Astenus) theodoridesi Jarrige, 1971
 Astenus (Astenus) thoracicus (Baudi di Selve, 1857)
 Astenus (Astenus) thoracicus thoracicus (Baudi di Selve, 1857)
 Astenus (Astenus) thoracicus villiersi C.Koch, 1941
 Astenus (Astenus) transversofasciatus Coiffait, 1980
 Astenus (Astenus) unicolor (Mulsant & Rey, 1878)
 Astenus (Astenus) uniformis (Jacquelin du Val, 1853)
 Astenus (Astenus) uyttenboogaarti Bernhauer, 1928
 Astenus (Astenus) varians Cameron, 1931
 Astenus (Astenus) walkeri Fauvel, 1900
 Astenus (Astenus) wittmeri Coiffait, 1979

Astenus (Eurysunius) 

 Astenus (Eurysunius) affimbriatus Assing, 2014
 Astenus (Eurysunius) alcarazae Assing, 2003
 Astenus (Eurysunius) atlasicus Coiffait, 1969
 Astenus (Eurysunius) beirensis Coiffait, 1973
 Astenus (Eurysunius) bicoloratus Assing, 2002
 Astenus (Eurysunius) brachati Assing, 2011
 Astenus (Eurysunius) breuili Jarrige, 1952
 Astenus (Eurysunius) callaecianus Coiffait, 1971
 Astenus (Eurysunius) carinatus Coiffait, 1969
 Astenus (Eurysunius) cerrutii Coiffait, 1960
 Astenus (Eurysunius) colasi Coiffait, 1960
 Astenus (Eurysunius) collaris (Fauvel, 1873)
 Astenus (Eurysunius) contestanus Coiffait, 1980
 Astenus (Eurysunius) corsicus Coiffait, 1960
 Astenus (Eurysunius) curtulus (Erichson, 1840)
 Astenus (Eurysunius) deharvengi Coiffait, 1980
 Astenus (Eurysunius) focarillei Coiffait, 1960
 Astenus (Eurysunius) goeki AnlaÅŸ, 2017
 Astenus (Eurysunius) graecus Reitter, 1909
 Astenus (Eurysunius) gusarovi AnlaÅŸ, 2015
 Astenus (Eurysunius) hexatrichius Coiffait, 1980
 Astenus (Eurysunius) hispanicus Coiffait, 1980
 Astenus (Eurysunius) honazicus AnlaÅŸ, 2015
 Astenus (Eurysunius) ilgazi AnlaÅŸ, 2016
 Astenus (Eurysunius) knischi Bernhauer, 1928
 Astenus (Eurysunius) kocheri Jarrige, 1952
 Astenus (Eurysunius) kochi Bernhauer, 1936
 Astenus (Eurysunius) kociani Assing, 2015
 Astenus (Eurysunius) kumlutasi AnlaÅŸ, 2015
 Astenus (Eurysunius) kyrnosus Coiffait, 1960
 Astenus (Eurysunius) latus (Rosenhauer, 1856)
 Astenus (Eurysunius) martinezii (UhagÃ³n, 1876)
 Astenus (Eurysunius) mateui Coiffait, 1960
 Astenus (Eurysunius) melendizicus AnlaÅŸ, 2018
 Astenus (Eurysunius) minos Assing, 2003
 Astenus (Eurysunius) myrmecophilus (Wollaston, 1864)
 Astenus (Eurysunius) occiduus Assing, 2007
 Astenus (Eurysunius) orgeli AnlaÅŸ, 2015
 Astenus (Eurysunius) paganettii Bernhauer, 1928
 Astenus (Eurysunius) panousei Coiffait, 1969
 Astenus (Eurysunius) paphlagonicus Assing, 2002
 Astenus (Eurysunius) paradoxus (Eppelsheim, 1878)
 Astenus (Eurysunius) platynotus (Saulcy, 1865)
 Astenus (Eurysunius) platyphtalmus Coiffait, 1971
 Astenus (Eurysunius) rhodicus Assing, 2013
 Astenus (Eurysunius) sandiklicus AnlaÅŸ, 2014
 Astenus (Eurysunius) schatzmayri Bernhauer, 1929
 Astenus (Eurysunius) schrami Coiffait, 1960
 Astenus (Eurysunius) segurae Assing, 2003
 Astenus (Eurysunius) setifer Cameron, 1930
 Astenus (Eurysunius) setiger (Vauloger de Beaupré, 1897)
 Astenus (Eurysunius) sexsetosus Assing, 2002
 Astenus (Eurysunius) shavrini Assing, 2010
 Astenus (Eurysunius) siculus Fauvel, 1900
 Astenus (Eurysunius) sultanicus Assing, 2010
 Astenus (Eurysunius) thessalonicus Coiffait, 1971
 Astenus (Eurysunius) thripticus Assing, 2013
 Astenus (Eurysunius) trisetulosus Coiffait, 1971
 Astenus (Eurysunius) tristis (Erichson, 1840)
 Astenus (Eurysunius) truncatus Coiffait, 1971
 Astenus (Eurysunius) vaucheri Jarrige, 1952
 Astenus (Eurysunius) velebiticus Reitter, 1909
 Astenus (Eurysunius) wunderlei Assing, 2014

Astenus (Mecognathus) 

 Astenus (Mecognathus) ampliventris (Reitter, 1900) Astenus (Mecognathus) chimaera (Wollaston, 1854)
 Astenus (Mecognathus) wollastoni Coiffait, 1971 Subgenus unspecified 

 Astenus aberlenci Janák & Lecoq, 2007
 Astenus abessinus Bernhauer, 1915
 Astenus albipes Cameron, 1928
 Astenus alluaudi (Fauvel, 1905)
 Astenus altivagans Bernhauer, 1939
 Astenus ambondrombe Janák & Lecoq, 2007
 Astenus ambrensis Janák, 2008
 Astenus ambulans Lea, 1923
 Astenus americanus (Casey, 1905)
 Astenus amicus (Sharp, 1876)
 Astenus andrewesi Cameron, 1931
 Astenus andringitra Janák & Lecoq, 2007
 Astenus andringitranus Janák & Lecoq, 2007
 Astenus angolensis Cameron, 1950
 Astenus angusticeps Scheerpeltz, 1976
 Astenus angusticollis Cameron, 1950
 Astenus angustipennis Bernhauer, 1942
 Astenus anjouanensis Lecoq, 1996
 Astenus ankaratrensis Lecoq, 1996
 Astenus apiciflavus (Lea, 1904)
 Astenus arizonianus (Casey, 1905)
 Astenus arrowi Bernhauer, 1939
 Astenus asitus D.N.Biswas & Sen Gupta, 1983
 Astenus attenuatus (Erichson, 1840)
 Astenus australicus Bernhauer, 1908
 Astenus baloghi Last, 1980
 Astenus barbarae C.Koch, 1941
 Astenus bicinctus (Fauvel, 1879)
 Astenus bicoloripennis Lecoq, 1996
 Astenus bifidus Lecoq, 1996
 Astenus binotatus (Say, 1823)
 Astenus biplagiatus (Motschulsky, 1858)
 Astenus birmanus Fauvel, 1895
 Astenus biroi Last, 1980
 Astenus bisalicus D.N.Biswas & Sen Gupta, 1983
 Astenus bisignatus (Erichson, 1840)
 Astenus bispinus (Motschulsky, 1858)
 Astenus bivittatus (Eppelsheim, 1885)
 Astenus bonus Last, 1980
 Astenus borbonicus Janák & Lecoq, 2007
 Astenus brasilianus Bernhauer, 1908
 Astenus bredoi Bernhauer, 1943
 Astenus breviceps Wendeler, 1956
 Astenus brevipennis (Austin, 1877)
 Astenus brevipes (Sharp, 1874)
 Astenus bryanti Cameron, 1941
 Astenus buehleri Scheerpeltz, 1957
 Astenus burgeoni Bernhauer, 1934
 Astenus californicus (Austin, 1877)
 Astenus cameroni Scheerpeltz, 1933
 Astenus capitalis Fauvel, 1889
 Astenus castaneus Cameron, 1920
 Astenus cephalus Last, 1980
 Astenus ceylonicus Cameron, 1931
 Astenus chapmani Bernhauer, 1937
 Astenus cheesmani Cameron, 1937
 Astenus chloroticus (Sharp, 1874)
 Astenus cinctiventris (Sharp, 1886)
 Astenus cinctus (Say, 1831)
 Astenus clementi Lecoq, 1996
 Astenus coarctatus (Erichson, 1840)
 Astenus cognatus (Sharp, 1886)
 Astenus comoranus Lecoq, 1996
 Astenus comorensis Lecoq, 1996
 Astenus concolor (Kraatz, 1859)
 Astenus condei Wendeler, 1956
 Astenus cruzensis Coiffait, 1985
 Astenus cubensis Blackwelder, 1943
 Astenus cylindricus (W.J.MacLeay, 1871)
 Astenus cyprius Lokay, 1919
 †Astenus demersus (C.Heyden & L.Heyden, 1866)
 Astenus descarpentriesi Jarrige, 1978
 Astenus diegoensis Lecoq, 1996
 Astenus difficilis Cameron, 1951
 Astenus discopunctatus (Say, 1831)
 Astenus distinctus Cameron, 1947
 Astenus diversiventris Cameron, 1943
 Astenus dodo Janák & Lecoq, 2007
 Astenus drescheri Cameron, 1936
 Astenus duflosi Lecoq, 1996
 Astenus elevator Fauvel, 1907
 Astenus elongatus Janák & Lecoq, 2007
 Astenus epipleuralis Cameron, 1950
 Astenus eppelsheimi Bernhauer & K.Schubert, 1912
 Astenus erinaceus Fagel, 1965
 Astenus euryalus Fernando, 1959
 Astenus explicatus Last, 1984
 Astenus fasciatus (Solsky, 1871)
 Astenus favosus (Lea, 1906)
 Astenus filiventris (Sharp, 1886)
 Astenus fimetarius Fauvel, 1907
 Astenus fisheri Janák & Lecoq, 2007
 Astenus flavicollis Bernhauer, 1912
 Astenus flavipennis Bernhauer, 1927
 Astenus flavolineatus Bernhauer, 1937
 Astenus fletcheri Wendeler, 1927
 Astenus formosanus Bernhauer, 1939
 Astenus fortepunctatus Fagel, 1965
 Astenus foveapennis Wendeler, 1956
 Astenus frater Cameron, 1941
 Astenus fraterculus Bernhauer, 1937
 Astenus friebi Bernhauer, 1927
 Astenus fusciceps (Casey, 1905)
 Astenus galapagoensis Coiffait, 1981
 Astenus geniculatus Last, 1980
 Astenus gerardi Bernhauer, 1932
 Astenus ghumensis Cameron, 1943
 Astenus gracilentus (Fauvel, 1879)
 Astenus gratiosus Cameron, 1951
 Astenus gratus Cameron, 1931
 Astenus guttalis Cameron, 1930
 Astenus guttipennis Fauvel, 1907
 Astenus guttulus (Fauvel, 1877)
 Astenus h-signatus Cameron, 1914
 Astenus hackeri (Lea, 1906)
 Astenus hammondi Lecoq, 1996
 Astenus hindostanus Cameron, 1919
 Astenus horni Bernhauer, 1939
 Astenus horridus Rougemont, 2018
 Astenus inconstans (Casey, 1905)
 Astenus indri Janák & Lecoq, 2007
 Astenus inermis Lecoq, 1996
 Astenus insignis Bernhauer, 1939
 Astenus interjectus Last, 1984
 Astenus itremo Lecoq, 1996
 Astenus ivohibensis Lecoq, 1996
 Astenus japonicus Zhao, Mei-Jun & Sakai, 1999
 Astenus jhopus D.N.Biswas & Sen Gupta, 1983
 Astenus jocquei Lecoq, 1996
 Astenus julus Fernando, 1959
 Astenus juvus Blackwelder, 1943
 Astenus kashmiricus Cameron, 1943
 Astenus kilimanjarensis Fagel, 1965
 Astenus kivuensis Bernhauer, 1934
 Astenus kokodanus Cameron, 1937
 Astenus kraatzi Bernhauer, 1902
 Astenus lacertosus Lecoq, 1996
 Astenus latecingulatus Bernhauer, 1939
 Astenus lateralis (Erichson, 1840)
 Astenus lateripennis Bernhauer, 1939
 Astenus latifrons (Sharp, 1874)
 Astenus lepesmei Bernhauer, 1942
 Astenus limbatus (Erichson, 1840)
 Astenus linearis (Erichson, 1840)
 Astenus longiceps (R.F.Sahlberg, 1847)
 Astenus longicollis (Eppelsheim, 1885)
 Astenus longinasus (Sharp, 1886)
 Astenus longiusculus (Mannerheim, 1830)
 Astenus longospiculus Lecoq, 1996
 Astenus louwerensi Cameron, 1940
 Astenus luteus Wendeler, 1956
 Astenus luzonicus Bernhauer, 1919
 Astenus machadoi Cameron, 1950
 Astenus majorinus Lea, 1923
 Astenus mandibularis Lea, 1923
 Astenus manongarivo Janák & Lecoq, 2007
 Astenus marginalis Cameron, 1931
 Astenus marginatus (Sharp, 1876)
 Astenus marginellus Cameron, 1930
 Astenus marmoratus Cameron, 1937
 Astenus mauretanicus Coiffait, 1971
 Astenus mauritianus Janák & Lecoq, 2007
 Astenus mauriticus Janák & Lecoq, 2007
 Astenus methneri Bernhauer, 1937
 Astenus micropterus Bernhauer, 1937
 Astenus microthorax (Fauvel, 1875)
 Astenus minutipennis Wendeler, 1956
 Astenus modestus Bernhauer, 1931
 Astenus montanellus Bernhauer, 1939
 Astenus montanus Herman, 2003
 Astenus naivashanus Cameron, 1950
 Astenus naomii Zhao & Mei-Jun, 1996
 Astenus nevermanni Bernhauer, 1942
 Astenus nilgiriensis Cameron, 1931
 Astenus nisus Fernando, 1959
 Astenus noctivagans Cameron, 1948
 Astenus noctivagus Lea, 1923
 Astenus nodieri Lecoq, 1996
 Astenus notatellus Fauvel, 1907
 Astenus notula Fauvel, 1898
 Astenus notula notula Fauvel, 1898
 Astenus notula notuloides Lecoq, 1996
 Astenus obscureguttatus Cameron, 1950
 Astenus obscurus Cameron, 1931
 Astenus ohbayashii Zhao, Mei-Jun & Sakai, 1997
 Astenus oligopterus Bernhauer, 1934
 Astenus opaculus (Sharp, 1886)
 Astenus ophis Fauvel, 1895
 Astenus orientalis Cameron, 1918
 Astenus ornatellus (Casey, 1905)
 Astenus papuanus Cameron, 1931
 Astenus paranensis (Lynch ArribÃ¡lzaga, 1884)
 Astenus parvipennis Bernhauer, 1922
 Astenus parvispinosus Janák, 2008
 Astenus pauliani Lecoq, 1996
 Astenus pectinatus (Fauvel, 1878)
 Astenus peraffinis Cameron, 1931
 Astenus perangustoides Janák & Lecoq, 2007
 Astenus perangustus Fauvel, 1905
 Astenus peregrinus Bernhauer, 1939
 Astenus peringueyi Fagel, 1961
 Astenus perrieri Fauvel, 1905
 Astenus persimilis Cameron, 1952
 Astenus peteri Rougemont, 2018
 Astenus peyrierasi Lecoq, 1996
 Astenus philippinus Bernhauer, 1915
 Astenus pilatei (Sharp, 1886)
 Astenus pleuritus Coiffait, 1976
 Astenus productor Fauvel, 1907
 Astenus prolixus (Erichson, 1840)
 Astenus psilographus Fauvel, 1905
 Astenus puguensis Bernhauer, 1937
 Astenus pulcher Wendeler, 1956
 Astenus punctipennis Fauvel, 1905
 Astenus quadriceps Jarrige, 1960
 Astenus regulus Last, 1980
 Astenus reticollis Fauvel, 1889
 Astenus richardi Jarrige, 1957
 Astenus rigoensis Last, 1980
 Astenus robustulus (Casey, 1905)
 Astenus rudiventris Bernhauer, 1915
 Astenus rufobrunneus Bernhauer, 1939
 Astenus rufopiceus Bernhauer, 1915
 Astenus rufotestaceus Cameron, 1951
 Astenus rufulus Bernhauer, 1934
 Astenus ruteri Lecoq, 1996
 Astenus sakaii Zhao, Mei-Jun & Li-Zhen Li, 1998
 Astenus sanctus (Sharp, 1886)
 Astenus sauteri Bernhauer, 1922
 Astenus schenklingi Bernhauer, 1922
 Astenus scotti Bernhauer, 1922
 Astenus sectator (Casey, 1905)
 Astenus selangorensis Cameron, 1932
 Astenus serpens (Sharp, 1876)
 Astenus serpentarius Cameron, 1930
 Astenus setiferides Newton, 2017
 Astenus setipennis Bernhauer, 1942
 Astenus seydeli Cameron, 1952
 Astenus sharpi Scheerpeltz, 1933
 Astenus shibatai Ito & T., 1995
 Astenus signatellus (Sharp, 1886)
 Astenus signatus (R.F.Sahlberg, 1847)
 Astenus sikkimensis D.N.Biswas, 2003
 Astenus similis (Austin, 1877)
 Astenus simsoni (Lea, 1906)
 Astenus simulans (Casey, 1905)
 Astenus simulator Last, 1980
 Astenus sinoseptentrionalis (Jacot, 1923)
 Astenus sinuaticollis Bierig, 1934
 Astenus spectabilis Bernhauer, 1927
 Astenus spectrum (Casey, 1905)
 Astenus spiculifer Lecoq, 1996
 Astenus spinosus Zhao, Mei-Jun & Sakai, 1997
 Astenus staudingeri Cameron, 1941
 Astenus striativentris Wendeler, 1956
 Astenus striatus Last, 1980
 Astenus strictus (Sharp, 1876)
 Astenus strigiceps (Fauvel, 1879)
 Astenus strigilis (Casey, 1905)
 Astenus subcingulatus Bernhauer, 1939
 Astenus subgrandis Last, 1980
 Astenus submaculatus Cameron, 1937
 Astenus subnitidulus Bernhauer, 1937
 Astenus subnotatus Fauvel, 1904
 Astenus substrictus (Sharp, 1886)
 Astenus subtilicornis Fagel, 1965
 Astenus subtilis (Sharp, 1886)
 Astenus sumatrensis Cameron, 1925
 Astenus sutteri Scheerpeltz, 1957
 Astenus taiwanus Ito & T., 1996
 Astenus tanicus D.N.Biswas & Sen Gupta, 1983
 Astenus taprobanus Cameron, 1919
 Astenus tardus Lea, 1923
 Astenus tenuis (Sharp, 1886)
 Astenus tenuiventris (Casey, 1905)
 Astenus terminalis Cameron, 1931
 Astenus testaceus (Erichson, 1840)
 Astenus thaxteri Cameron, 1941
 Astenus theodorensis Cameron, 1941
 Astenus tricolor Cameron, 1930
 Astenus tricoloricornis Rougemont, 2017
 Astenus trilineatus (Lea, 1904)
 Astenus tropicus Bernhauer, 1915
 Astenus turneri Cameron, 1950
 Astenus uelensides Newton, 2017
 Astenus uelensis Cameron, 1929
 Astenus uluguruensis Bernhauer, 1915
 Astenus uncinatus Lecoq, 1996
 Astenus upis Tottenham, 1953
 Astenus vadoni Lecoq, 1996
 Astenus variegatus (Solsky, 1868)
 Astenus ventralis (Sharp, 1876)
 Astenus vianai Bernhauer, 1939
 Astenus viduus Jarrige, 1978
 Astenus viettei Jarrige, 1957
 Astenus vilhenai Cameron, 1951
 Astenus vilis (Sharp, 1886)
 Astenus vinsoni Lecoq, 1987
 Astenus viperinus Bernhauer, 1915
 Astenus vittatus (Sharp, 1876)
 Astenus walkerianus Bernhauer, 1929
 Astenus yapoensis Cameron, 1950
 Astenus yonezoi Ito & T., 1995
 Astenus zealandicus Cameron, 1945
 Astenus zumpti Bernhauer, 1939
 Astenus zuni'' (Casey, 1905)

References

Further reading 
 Anlaş, Sinan. "On the subgenus Eurysunius Reitter in Turkey III. A new species from western Anatolia and additional records (Coleoptera: Staphylinidae, Paederinae, Astenus)." Turkish Journal of Entomology 40.1 (2016).
 ANLAŞ, Sinan. "A new species of Astenus (Eurysunius) Dejean, 1833 from Turkey (Coleoptera: Staphylinidae, Paederinae)." Türkiye Entomoloji Dergisi38.3 (2014): 239–243.

Paederinae
Fauna of Turkey
Staphylinidae genera